Luigi Gervasi was an Italian set decorator. He was nominated for an Academy Award in the category Best Art Direction for the film The Taming of the Shrew.

Selected filmography
 The Taming of the Shrew (1967)

References

External links

Italian set decorators
Possibly living people
Year of birth missing